Stefanos Tzimas (born 6 January 2006) is a Greek professional footballer who plays as a forward for Super League Greece club  PAOK.

References

2006 births
Living people
Greek footballers
Greece youth international footballers
Super League Greece 2 players
PAOK FC players
PAOK FC B players
Association football forwards
Footballers from Thessaloniki